"Constellation" is a bebop composition written in 1948 by American jazz saxophonist Charlie Parker. It is a contrafact of "I Got Rhythm". "Constellation" was originally recorded by the Charlie Parker All-Stars on September 18, 1948 in New York City for Savoy Records.

The composition has been covered by numerous artists, including notable recordings by Miles Davis and Sonny Stitt.

See also
List of jazz contrafacts

References 

Jazz compositions
1948 songs
1940s jazz standards
Compositions by Charlie Parker
Bebop jazz standards